Black Mountain Open Space Park is a city park located in the suburbs of San Diego, California.

Description
The park offers numerous trails for hiking and biking, and boasts a variety of native animal and plant species.

Plant species
Native plant species preserved in Black Mountain Open Space Park include both chaparral and coastal sage scrub. Native to the east and north sides of the mountain, the chaparral community includes manzanita, laurel sumac, lemonade berry, coffee berry, chamise, toyon, and California lilac. The coastal sage scrub, native to the south and west faces of the mountain, include white and black sage, California sagebrush, California buckwheat, and California sunflower.

Animal species
The Black Mountain Open Space Park is home to a wide variety of animal species. Mammals include mule deer, bobcat, desert woodrat, and Pacific kangaroo rat, and many others. Among the more than 80 birds species that can be found in the park, rare birds like the California gnatcatcher, rufous-crowned sparrow, and northern harrier reside in the area. Reptiles include the red diamond rattlesnake and amphibians include the Pacific chorus frog and slender salamander.

Black Mountain

Black Mountain is the central feature of Black Mountain Open Space Park, standing at 1,554 feet (474 m) tall. At its peak, Black Mountain is host to a handful of communication towers, including a retired AT&T microwave repeater tower and a Verizon wireless communication facility.

Prior to European contact, the Kumeyaay lived on the mountain and referred to it as "Amat Kwanyil".

The mountain is also an extinct volcano, having last erupted 118-125 million years ago. Black Mountain is a part of the Santiago Peak Volcanoes, including Cowles Mountain, which are a group of volcanoes that originated as a chain of volcanic islands 150 million years ago.

Mine
Tucked away in the Black Mountain canyon is an abandoned arsenic mine, accessible via pathways branching off of the park's Miner's Ridge Loop trail. The mine was established in the 1920s by Escondido rancher, rodeo cowboy, and actor Frank Hopkins, due to the demand for white arsenic, a key ingredient in pesticides that attacked infesting boll weevils. As the boll weevil population shrank, the demand for white arsenic fell, causing the abandoning of the mine in 1927. According to a 1939 article, published in the Vista Press, Hopkins also used this mine to find gold.

In 2016, the University of San Diego conducted soil sampling in the vicinity of the mine site. Some locations, including portions of the Miner's Ridge Loop trail revealed high levels of arsenic present. As of January 6, 2017 the San Diego City Attorney recommended closure of the lower sections of the trail pending further study. 

The Jas Arnold Trail for All People (located at the Miner's Ridge Loop parking lot), a handicapped accessible trail named in honor of the park's long serving Chair of the Citizen's Advisory Committee who passed in May 2016 remains open to the public. The Lilac Canyon Trail which connects this same parking lot to the Glider Port also remains open.

Hiking
The park is a popular hiking spot, offering numerous trails of varying length and difficulty.

Trails
Lusardi Creek Loop Trail
East Rim Trail
Miner's Ridge Loop Trail
2.3 miles with 670 feet of climbing
 Accessible via Carmel Valley Rd.
Glider Point Trail
Nighthawk Trail
 Accessible via Hilltop Community Park 
Little Black Loop Trail
South Point View Trail

See also
 List of parks in San Diego

References

External links
 
 
 
 

Parks in San Diego
Municipal parks in California
Urban public parks
Regional parks in California